Robert, Rob or Bob Davies may refer to:

Politics
 Robert Henry Davies (1824–1902), British colonial official, Lieutenant Governor of the Punjab
 Robert J. Davies (1839–1892), Welsh politician and religious nonconformist
 Rob Davies (politician) (born 1948), minister of trade and industry of South Africa
 Robert Davies (politician) (1918–1967), British Labour politician

Sports
 Robert Davies (footballer, born 1861) (1861–?), Wrexham F.C. and Wales international footballer
 Robert Davies (footballer, born 1863) (1863–?), Druids F.C. and Wales international footballer
 Robert Davies (footballer, born 1869) (1869–?), Chester F.C., Wrexham F.C. and Wales international footballer
 Robert Davies (footballer, born 1876) (1876–?), British footballer
 Robert Idwal Davies (footballer) (1899–1980), Bolton Wanderers F.C. and Wales international footballer
 Robert G. Davies (fl. 1931–1936), footballer for Port Vale and Torquay United
 Bob Davies (footballer, born 1913), Welsh footballer, played for Blaenau Ffestiniog, Nottingham Forest and Rochdale (wartime)
 Rob Davies (footballer) (born 1987), Welsh international footballer for WBA and Worcester City F.C.
 Rob Davies (table tennis) (born 1984), Welsh para sport table tennis player
 Robert Davies (sport shooter) (1876–1916), British Olympic sports shooter
 Bob Davies (1920–1990), American basketball player
 Robbie Davies (1949–2017), British boxer
 Robbie Davies Jr. (born 1989), British boxer

Antiquaries
 Robert Davies (antiquary, died 1710) (1658–1710), Welsh naturalist and antiquary. Father of Robert Davies (antiquary, died 1728)
 Robert Davies (antiquary, died 1728) (1685/6–1728), Welsh antiquary
 Robert Davies (antiquary, died 1875) (1793–1875), English lawyer and antiquary

Other
 Robert T. Davies (1849–1916), Canadian businessman and racehorse owner and breeder
 Robert Davies (British Army officer) (1900–1975), British Army officer, recipient of the George Cross
 Robert Davies (bishop) (1913–2002), Australian Anglican bishop
 R. W. Davies (Robert William Davies, 1925–2021), British historian
 Bob Davies (businessman) (born 1948), British businessman

See also
 Davies
Rob Davies (disambiguation)
Robert Davis (disambiguation)